Mansquito (also known as Mosquito-Man) is a 2005 American made-for-television monster movie directed by Tibor Takács, and stars Corin Nemec, Musetta Vander and Matt Jordon. It shares many similarities with the 1986 adaptation of The Fly, and was conceived by Ray Cannella, Manager of Program Acquisition for the Syfy Channel. He and other two colleagues began producing films for the channel feeling that they could do better than the films they bought from independent producers.

Plot
Dr. Jennifer Allen in Baltimore, Maryland wants to find a cure for a disease known as the Gillen virus, a disease similar to, yet more deadly than, the "Fire Rising virus." She and a colleague capture infected mosquitoes and give them small doses of radiation. She explains that the levels have to be exact because if the mosquitoes receive too much radiation, the results could be more devastating than the virus itself.

A convict named Ray Erikson joins Dr. Allen's program in exchange for his lifelong prison sentence. He takes a hostage and convinces Dr. Allen to open the door to the experiment room. The security guards open fire and cause an explosion that showers Ray and Dr. Allen with the chemicals and the genetically altered mosquitoes. Ray manages to flee the scene.

He begins to transform into the titular monster, a deformed chimera, half man, half mosquito, yet he manages to find his way to his ex-girlfriend's apartment, where the process continues. When the ex comes home, she finds it in ruins. She and Ray have a short, anxious conversation before Ray's transformation is complete and he kills her.

Meanwhile, Dr. Allen returns home with her boyfriend, Baltimore Police Lieutenant Tom Randall. That evening, she notices her wrist is red and raw-looking. She thinks little of it, but by the next morning, it has spread to her entire arm. Later, while kissing Tom, she has a sudden craving for blood and bites him. He is called to Ray's girlfriend's apartment and leaves. Dr. Allen rushes into the bathroom to find her arm bleeding. She convulses, falls to the floor and her skin starts to bubble.

Tom arrives at the crime scene and is puzzled by the way Ray's girlfriend died. He is called to investigate another crime scene, where he encounters Mansquito. The monster seems unstoppable, until Tom shocks him with a stun gun, making him flee in pain. Tom's partner doesn't believe him at first but puts a bulletin out on the creature.

At the research station, Dr. Allen discovers she is also changing into a human-mosquito hybrid, but more slowly as she received a smaller dose than Ray. Mansquito appears but doesn't try to kill her, and after she faints, the monster leaves. Tom takes her to the hospital.

The doctor wants to give Dr. Allen a blood transfusion to slow down the transformation, but she replies that nothing can stop the mutation. She believes the monster sensed that she is turning into a creature like him and that once the transformation is complete, he will want to mate with her. Outside, a guard falls victim to the monster and Tom leaves to investigate. Mansquito undergoes another transformation, this time growing wings.

Dr. Allen also undergoes another transformation and alerts the officers of Mansquito's arrival. They fail to stop him. The monster heads for Dr. Allen, but she manages to escape. Tom fires a rocket launcher at the oxygen tanks behind Mansquito and assumes the creature was killed by the explosion, but that is not the case.

Meanwhile, back at the lab, Dr. Allen undergoes yet another transformation and releases the last batch of genetically altered mosquitoes, which have been perfected. Tom arrives and Dr. Allen tells him that Mansquito is still alive. She tries to commit suicide by stabbing herself with a syringe, because without a mate, Mansquito will die.

The monster arrives and Tom fights him to no avail. Dr. Allen is seriously injured by Mansquito, who is now focused on killing her rather than mating with her. Tom uses the stun gun and once again, it works. Seeing this, Dr. Allen breaks an electrical line and electrocutes Mansquito, sacrificing herself. Tom writes a report about the incident and the Gillen virus is wiped out by the altered mosquitoes.

Cast
 Corin Nemec as Lieutenant Thomas Randall
 Musetta Vander as Dr. Jennifer Allen
 Matt Jordon as Ray Erikson / Mansquito
 Patrick Dreikauss as Detective Charlie Morrison
 Jay Benedict as Dr. Aaron Michaels
 Christa Campbell as Liz
 Ivo Tonchev as Arrogant Swat Member
 Vladimir Nikolov as Barry

Release

Home media
The film was released on DVD by Millennium on May 17, 2005.

Reception
Dread Central awarded the film  a score of 3 out of 5. Noting the film's shortcomings and rudimentary plot but complimented the film's creature design, and gore effects, stating "Mansquito is a fun throwback to the b-movies of yore that’s more entertaining than it has any right to be. Perhaps it was just dumb luck or maybe the law of averages finally caught up with them but the Sci-Fi Channel finally produced a winner." Chris Carle from IGN gave the film a negative review, calling it "a lurching mess of silly logic, odd casting, bad CG and 1960's Japan-quality monster suit effects." HorrorNews.net while noting the film's faults, the reviewer felt that the makers did a decent enough job with the film to make it enjoyable. Felix Vasquez from Cinema Crazed gave the film a mostly positive review, writing, "This is another one of those so bad they’re good films with a really ridiculous concept, but overall you can’t help but like it a lot. With some great special effects, good gore, hilarious moments, and bad acting, you can’t take this too seriously. Enter with an open mind and you’ll enjoy it, like I did." David Cornelius from eFilmCritic awarded the film 2/5 stars, writing, "It pains me to say that none of this is nearly as fun as it should have been. Any movie with a plot this insane must, by all accounts, be either outrageously stupid or deliciously, self-consciously entertaining. Mansquito is neither. Aside from a few moments of uncontrollable idiocy (mostly involving the grand miscasting of nice guy Nemic as badass cop), there's very little here that manages to do anything other than bore."

References

External links
 
 
 
 
 Parker Lewis Star Swats Mansquito, Corin Nemec

2005 films
2005 television films
2000s monster movies
2000s science fiction horror films
American horror television films
American science fiction television films
American monster movies
2000s English-language films
Films set in Baltimore
Films shot in Bulgaria
Nu Image films
Syfy original films
American science fiction horror films
Films directed by Tibor Takács
Films produced by Boaz Davidson
Films with screenplays by Boaz Davidson
2000s American films
Films about mosquitoes